Zafer Ceyhun Tendar (born April 14, 1987, in İzmir) is a Turkish volleyball player. He is currently a player of the Fenerbahçe Grundig. He also played three years for Arkas Spor, who is 1.87 m. tall. He is also a student at Ege University in the Sports Management department.

References

1987 births
Living people
Turkish men's volleyball players
Arkas Spor volleyball players
Fenerbahçe volleyballers
21st-century Turkish people